The first season of the American neo-Western television series Justified premiered on March 16, 2010, on FX, and concluded on June 8, 2010, consisting of 13 episodes. The series was developed by Graham Yost based on Elmore Leonard's novels Pronto and Riding the Rap and his short story "Fire in the Hole". Its main character is Raylan Givens, a deputy U.S. Marshal. Timothy Olyphant portrays Givens, a tough federal lawman, enforcing his own brand of justice in his Kentucky hometown. The series is set in the city of Lexington, Kentucky, and the hill country of eastern Kentucky, specifically in and around Harlan.

Plot
The season one story arc concentrates on the crimes of the Crowder family and relationship of Crowder and Givens families. After Raylan Givens (Timothy Olyphant) kills a Miami gun thug in a questionable manner, he is transferred to his home state of Kentucky. When he hears that Ava Crowder (Joelle Carter) had killed her abusive husband Bowman, Raylan seeks to protect her from revenge by the Crowder clan. The initial threat comes from Boyd Crowder (Walton Goggins), a local criminal masquerading as a white supremacist whom Raylan once dug coal with. Raylan shoots Boyd in the chest but Boyd survives and claims it's a sign from God that he should change his ways. 

The Crowder family patriarch Bo (M. C. Gainey) is released from prison after Raylan arrests the Harlan county sheriff who has ties to the Miami cartel that has put a price on Raylan's head. Bo seeks to rebuild his criminal empire and settle old scores. Boyd is released after AUSA Vazquez, who is investigating Raylan's questionable shootings, discovers Ava and Raylan have been sleeping together. 

While Bo works on gaining dominance over the meth trade, Boyd collects a camp of spiritually reformed criminals to clean up Harlan's meth problem. When a confidential informant is killed, Raylan promises to send Boyd back to jail.  In the meantime, Raylan is dealing with his own personal dilemmas, including working in the same building as his ex-wife (Natalie Zea), for whom he continues to harbor feelings; dealing with his criminal father, Arlo (Raymond J. Barry), who Bo believes cheated him out of protection money; figuring out how to handle his relationship with Ava; and avoiding hitmen hired by Gio, a Miami cartel boss. 

Raylan's continuing visits to Harlan are peppered with small crimes and big shootings, and his success in dealing with these matters draws Bo's attention leading to Bo making a deal with Gio to be his meth cooker. The plan is derailed when Boyd blows up a shipment from Miami. After Bo finds out, he exiles Boyd from his camp and kills all of Boyd's followers causing Boyd to question his mission.  Boyd offers to help Raylan to stop Bo permanently. 

Bo takes Ava hostage to the Crowder cabin where he demands Raylan's life for Ava in order to appease the Miami cartel. Raylan and Boyd manage to kill Bo's guards and shoot Bo in the leg but Gio's niece and nephew arrive and they attack the house with machine guns. Bo is killed, while Boyd, Ava, and Raylan are trapped; the niece and nephew demand Raylan be turned over to them. 

After Boyd attempts to pass himself off as Raylan, Raylan tells Boyd and Ava to leave out the back way, and he walks forward, hands in the air. As the niece and nephew step out to shoot him, Boyd shoots the nephew and the niece runs away. Boyd wants to go after her, but Raylan confronts him, asking what Boyd what he intends to do with the girl after he catches her. Boyd replies that he's unsure, and then drives away in Bo's Cadillac, while neither using or facing violence. As Boyd rides off Raylan pulls his gun and pretends to shoot, essentially suggesting they will always be allies and enemies.

Cast and characters

Main
 Timothy Olyphant as Deputy U.S. Marshal Raylan Givens
 Nick Searcy as Chief Deputy U.S. Marshal Art Mullen
 Joelle Carter as Ava Crowder
 Jacob Pitts as Deputy U.S. Marshal Tim Gutterson
 Erica Tazel as Deputy U.S. Marshal Rachel Brooks
 Natalie Zea as Winona Hawkins

Recurring

Guest
 Steven Flynn as Emmitt Arnett
 Kevin Rankin as Derek "Devil" Lennox
 Matt Craven as Chief Deputy Marshal Grant
 Stephen Root as Judge Mike Reardon

Production

Filming
While the pilot was shot in Pittsburgh and suburban Kittanning, Pennsylvania and Washington, Pennsylvania, the subsequent episodes were shot in California. The small town of Green Valley, California often doubles for Harlan, Kentucky.  In the pilot, Pittsburgh's David L. Lawrence Convention Center appears on film as the small town "airport" and the construction of the new Consol Energy Center serves as the "new courthouse".

Episodes

Reception
On Rotten Tomatoes, the season has an approval rating of 93% with an average score of 8.3 out of 10 based on 43 reviews. The website's critical consensus reads, "A coolly violent drama, Justified benefits from a seductive look and a note-perfect Timothy Olyphant performance." On Metacritic, the season has a weighted average score of 80 out of 100, based on 27 critics, indicating "universal acclaim.

TV Guide critic Matt Roush praised the show, particularly the acting of Olyphant, stating: "The show is grounded in Olyphant's low-key but high-impact star-making performance, the work of a confident and cunning leading man who's always good company." Chicago Tribune critic Maureen Ryan also praised the series, writing: "The shaggily delightful dialogue, the deft pacing, the authentic sense of place, the rock-solid supporting cast and the feeling that you are in the hands of writers, actors and directors who really know what they're doing—all of these are worthy reasons to watch Justified." Mike Hale of The New York Times praised the shows "modest virtues", but was critical of the first season's pace and characterisation, writing: "Justified can feel so low-key that even the crisis points drift past without making much of an impression... It feels as if the attention that should have gone to the storytelling all went to the atmosphere and the repartee."

Awards
Justified received a 2010 Peabody Award. For the first season, the series received a single Primetime Emmy Award nomination, for Outstanding Original Main Title Theme Music.

Ratings
The first season averaged 2.417 million viewers and a 0.9 rating in the 18–49 demographic.

Home media release
The first season was released on Blu-ray and DVD in region 1 on January 18, 2011, in region 2 on November 29, 2010, and in region 4 on June 7, 2012. Special features on the season one set include four audio commentaries by cast and crew, five behind-the-scenes featurettes, a music video, and a season two trailer.

References

External links

 

01
2010 American television seasons